"Ten Feet Tall" is a song performed by Dutch music producer and DJ Afrojack featuring vocals from American singer Wrabel, with "Ten Feet Tall" becoming Wrabel's first international chart hit. It was released on 4 February 2014 as the second single from Forget the World (2014).

Track listing
Digital download – single
"Ten Feet Tall" (featuring Wrabel) – 3:53

Digital download – David Guetta remix
"Ten Feet Tall" (David Guetta Remix) (featuring Wrabel) – 6:09

Charts

Weekly charts

Year-end charts

Certifications

References

2014 singles
2014 songs
Afrojack songs
Songs written for films
Songs written by Chris Braide
Songs written by Wrabel
Island Records singles
Wrabel songs